Azhahendra Sollukku Amudha is a 2016 Indian Tamil-language romantic drama film directed by Nagarajan and starring Rejan and Aashritha.

Cast 
Rejan as Murugan
Aashritha as Amudha
Pattimandram Raja as Murugan's father
Rekha Suresh as Murugan's mother
Mahanadi Shankar
Mippu

Production 
The film is directed by Suseenthiran's assistant Rejan. The film was shot in Chennai, Ennore, Perambur, Thandyarpet, and Vyasarpadi.

Soundtrack 
The songs are composed by Rajin Mahadev.

Release and reception 
The film released on 2 December 2016 and was removed from theatres three days later due to the then chief minister of Tamil Nadu J. Jayalalithaa's death. The Times of India gave the film a rating of one out of five stars and wrote that "the film is, sadly, a concoction of numerous bad clichés one has seen in Tamil cinema over the years". Hindu Tamil Thisai praised the cinematography and music while criticising the climax. Maalai Malar gave the film a rating of eighty out of hundred and praised the cinematography and songs. Samayam Tamil gave the film a rating of three out of five praising the songs and criticising the screenplay.

References 

Indian romantic drama films